Sonora State Highway 149 (Carretera Estatal 149) is a highway in the south of the Mexican state of Sonora.

It runs from Navojoa, where it is named Rafael J. Almada Boulevard, to the junction with Highway to Bacobampo and Sonora State Highway 56.

References

149